Connective may refer to:

 Connective tissue
 Discourse connective, in linguistics,  a word or phrase like "therefore" or "in other words".
 Logical connective
 In the stamen of flowers, the sterile tissue that connects the anther chambers to one another and to the filament

See also
 Connection (disambiguation)